Gossamer fabric is a thin, sheer woven fabric. The structure of the fabric is similar to a gauze. It is usually made of silk, cotton, or wool. The fabric may be coated with rubber to make it waterproof.

Gossamer 
The name of the fabric is said of something very fine and delicate, and it is associated with a thread-like filmy substance spun by small spiders.

Use 
The Gossamer is a very delicate and a see-through fabric. It is used in veils, dresses, long streamers, curtains, and decorations.

See also 

 Casement cloth
 Marquisette
 Ninon

References 

Woven fabrics
Net fabrics